Cucullia balsamitae is a moth belonging to the family Noctuidae. The species was first described by Jean Baptiste Boisduval in 1840.

It is native to Europe.

References

Noctuidae
Insects described in 1840
Taxa named by Jean Baptiste Boisduval
Moths of Europe